The 2022–23 Temple Owls men's basketball team represented Temple University during the 2022–23 NCAA Division I men's basketball season. The Owls, led by fourth-year head coach Aaron McKie, played their home games at the Liacouras Center in Philadelphia, Pennsylvania as a member of the American Athletic Conference.

Previous season
The Owls finished the 2021–22 season 17–12, 10–7 in AAC Play to finish in fourth place. They lost in the quarterfinals of the AAC tournament to Tulane.

Offseason

Departures

Incoming transfers

Recruiting classes

2022 recruiting class

2023 recruiting class

Roster

Schedule and results

|-
!colspan=12 style=| Non-conference regular season

|-
!colspan=12 style=| AAC Regular Season

|-
!colspan=12 style=| AAC Tournament

Source

References

Temple Owls men's basketball seasons
Temple
Temple
Temple